The Northwestern Wildcats women's lacrosse team is an NCAA Division I college lacrosse team representing Northwestern University as part of the Big Ten Conference. It was a member of the American Lacrosse Conference until the 2013-14 season, when the conference was dissolved as the Big Ten was sponsoring women's lacrosse from the 2014-15 season.  The team began competition at the varsity level in 1982, operated as a club sport from 1993 to 2001, and resumed play at the varsity level in 2002.  They play their home games at Lakeside Field in Evanston, IL.  From 2005 to 2009, the team won the NCAA Women's Lacrosse Championship five consecutive times and recorded two undefeated seasons.  After losing in the finals in 2010, the Wildcats added their sixth and seventh championships in 2011 and 2012.  The midwestern team's success is a rarity in a sport that enjoys most of its popularity on the East Coast - the Wildcats are the only team from outside the Eastern Time Zone to win the national title.

History

The Wildcats began playing in 1982 and enjoyed success early, appearing in the NCAA tournament five times before budget cuts forced the team to disband in 1993.  Northwestern hired former Maryland player Kelly Amonte Hiller to be the head coach when the university revived the team in 2002.  Hiller had to think outside the box in forming her squad; she recruited two freshmen who had never played the game before after seeing them jog around campus (they went on to be named All-Americans).  Her methods proved successful, however, and the team improved its record every year from its inception until 2005, when the Wildcats went undefeated and won their first national title.  Two years and two more championships later in 2007, they joined Maryland as the only teams to win three consecutive national titles.  The Wildcats would take home championship trophies again in 2008 and after a second undefeated season in 2009.  The streak ended in 2010 when the team lost to Maryland in a championship game that set the attendance record for a women's lacrosse match in the United States. During their five-year championship run, the Wildcats had a record of 106-3 and were undefeated at home. The Wildcats started a new streak the following year when they won their sixth championship, and then a seventh in 2012. Their streak of finals appearances would end in 2013 following a Final Four loss to the North Carolina Tar Heels.

When the team visited the White House after winning their first championship, they created a minor fashion scandal when some members wore flip-flops.  The publicity inspired the team to auction off their sandals with the proceeds going to the Friends of Jaclyn charity.  The team first met Jaclyn Murphy in 2005 when she was recovering from a brain tumor and their support prompted her father to start a charity that matches other college teams with pediatric brain tumor patients.

Historical Statistics
*Statistics thru 2020 season

Individual career records
Reference:

Individual single-season records

Seasons

†NCAA canceled 2020 collegiate activities due to the COVID-19 virus.

Postseason Results

The Wildcats have appeared in 20 NCAA tournaments. Their postseason record is 47-15.

Awards and Records
Tewaaraton Trophy
Kristen Kjellman – 2006, 2007
Hannah Nielsen – 2008, 2009
Shannon Smith – 2011

Honda Sports Award – Lacrosse
Kristen Kjellman – 2005, 2006, 2007
Hannah Nielsen – 2008, 2009
Shannon Smith – 2011
Taylor Thornton – 2012

Big Ten – Suzy Favor Athlete of the Year
Hannah Nielsen – 2008
Shannon Smith – 2011

Intercollegiate Women's Lacrosse Coaches Association Division I National Coach of the Year
Kelly Amonte Hiller – 2005, 2008, 2009, 2011, 2012

Big Ten Tournament MVP – Lacrosse
Mallory Weisse – 2019
Izzy Scane – 2021

References

External links
 

 
1982 establishments in Illinois
Lacrosse clubs established in 1982